The 1st Bersaglieri Regiment is an active unit of the Italian Army based in Cosenza in the Calabria region. The regiment is part of the Italian infantry corps' Bersaglieri speciality and operationally assigned to the Bersaglieri Brigade "Garibaldi". The Regiment is among the most experienced units of the Italian Army in missions abroad, and is the regiment with the highest number of decorations for military valour of the army.

History 
Despite how the Bersaglieri speciality can trace its origins back to 1836, until 1861 only Bersaglieri Battalions existed.

1861-1915 
The Bersaglieri Command of the 1st Army Corps of the Royal Italian Army was established on 16 April 1861; under the Bersaglieri Command were placed 6 Bersaglieri Battalions, which took part in the First Italian War of Independence, the Second Italian War of Independence and the Crimean War. The Bersaglieri Command included I, IX, XIII, XIX, XXI, and XXVII Battalions, as well as a Depot Battalion.

The I Battalion was established in 1848, and it included the 1st Company, i.e. the first Bersaglieri unit ever established.

The Bersaglieri Command was renamed 1st Bersaglieri Command on 31 December 1861; the Regiment, at first, did not have operational tasks, but only disciplinary and administration powers. In 1865 VI and VII Battalions were moved from the disestablished 4th Bersaglieri Regiment to the 1st Bersaglieri Regiment. In 1866 the 1st Bersaglieri Regiment participated in the Third Italian War of Independence.

The 1st Bersaglieri Regiment, after having acquired operational tasks, was moved to Turin on 1 January 1871. The Regiment consisted of I, VII, and IX Battalions. The Regiment took part in later years to Battle of Dogali and to the First Italo-Ethiopian War.

The I Cyclists Battalion was established on 1 October 1910. In 1911 the 1st Bersaglieri Regiment took part in the 1911 Italo-Turkish War.

World War I and afterwards: 1915-1939 
The 1st Bersaglieri Regiment did not take part in the Italian front. On 19 May 1915 the whole Regiment (with the exception of the I Cyclists Battalion) arrived in Libya. The Regiment gained the LV Battalion (established on 5 January 1915); the Battalion was sent to Misurata and fought in Ras-Bu-Kormar, Funduk ad in Marmarica. In February 1916 the Regimental Command was repatriated leaving the Battalions, now autonomous, in Libya until 1918. A provisional Company drawn from the Regiment was assigned to the expeditionary corps in Palestina in 1917.

On 15 May 1918, the 3 autonomous Battalions were repatriated back into Italy and the 1st Regiment was reestablished and sent to Vicenza, which were reached by the LV Battalion on 7 July 1918; however, I, VII, and IX Battalions were assigned to the various Assault Groups and sent in various locations.

The I Cyclists Battalion fought valiantly and was decorated with the Bronze Medal of Military Valour.

During World War I, the 1st Bersaglieri Regiment was headquartered in Naples, and recruited from Cefalù, Frosinone, Ivrea, Lecco, Mondovì, Pesaro, Pistoia, Reggio Calabria, and Siena Districts, while it mobilized also from Avellino, Benevento, Campagna, Nola, Salerno, and Castrovillari Districts.

The I Cyclists Battalion was disestablished in March 1919.

The IX and VII Battalions were transformed in cadre units in 1920. The VII Battalion was re-established on 30 April 1923. From July 1924 to 1936, the Regiment was transformed into a Cyclists Regiment. In 1926 the 1st Bersaglieri Regiment consisted of the Regiment Command, the I and VII Battalions, and Depot.

In 1939, the IX Battalion was re-established within the 1st Bersaglieri Regiment and a Motorcyclists Company was added to the Regiment. In April 1939, The Regiment took part in the Italian invasion of Albania.

World War II: 1940-1943 

The 1st Bersaglieri Regiment fought on the Western Front, in Albania, and in Southern France.

With the beginning of World War II, the 1st Bersaglieri Regiment was placed within the Celere Group of the 1st Army, moving its headquarters in Naples.

In November 1940, the IX Battalion crossed the Yugoslavian border; the VII Battalion was assigned to Division "Bari" and employed in border clashes. On 14 November, the I Battalion was assigned to the Alpine Division "Julia"; in Albania, the I and VII Battalions were employed on 17 November.

As a whole, the 1st Bersaglieri Regiment counter-attacked around Vrumbellake mountain, but soon retreated, in order to protect the left flank of the Division "Vicenza". From 29 November 1940 to 28 February 1941 the Regimental Command and the IX Battalion fought on the Greek front in Ezeke, Ocrida and Kalase mountain.

On 22 January 1941, the IX Battalion was assigned to the III Army Corps; on 15 February, the remaining Regiment incorporated the 81st Replacements Battalion of the 5th Bersaglieri Regiment. In early March 1941, the Regiment supported the Armoured Division "Centauro", being tasked with the defence of Scutari.

In April 1941, the 1st Bersaglieri Regiment counter-attacked and on 17 April 1941 it reached Ragusa. After two more months, the Regiment came back to Italy on 24 June 1941. On 31 July 1941, the Regiment was assigned to the 8th Army, tasked with the defence of Southern Italy, and on 15 August 1941 it was moved to Calabria.

A year later, in August 1942, the 1st Bersaglieri Regiment was moved to Piedmont and, in November, into France around Draguignon. From January to August 1943 the Regiment carried out police operations; the II Battalion was moved to Nice on 28 April 1943 in order to deal with public order service, while in late June 1943 the Motorcycles Company participated in an important police operation around Entreveaux.

Bersaglieri in Naples fought against German troops on 8 September 1943. Due to the Armistice of Cassibile, the 1st Bersaglieri Regiment was disbanded in Turin area.

Between 1940 and 1943, the Regiment consisted of:
 Regiment Command;
 Regimental Command Company;
 I Cyclist Bersaglieri Battalion;
 VII Cyclist Bersaglieri Battalion;
 IX Cyclist Bersaglieri Battalion;
 81st Replacement Battalion;
 1st Anti-tank Company.

Cold War: 1953-1976 
After World War II, Bersaglieri Regiments were the infantry element of the armoured brigades, which were considered to be a quick reaction force.p. 60 According to 1951 organic tables, Bersaglieri regiments had a Regimental Command, 3 Battalions and an Anti-tank Company each.p. 58

The 1st Bersaglieri Regiment was re-established on 1 January 1953. The Regiment was subordinated to the Armoured Division "Pozzuolo del Friuli"; the Regiment included the I and VII Battalions and, since 1 March 1954, the IX Battalion. While the Regiment as a whole was headquartered in Viterbo, I and VII Battalions were based in Rome and IX Battalion was based in Civitavecchia.p. 70

In 1956 the Army structure was modified again. The new organization of a Bersaglieri Regiment consisted of a Regimental Command Company (Command Platoon, Signals Platoon, Services Platoon), an Anti-tank Company (with three Platoons) and three Battalions. Each Battalion, in turn, consisted of a Command Company, 3 Bersaglieri Companies and 1 Support weapons Company.p. 117

1958 was a year full of modifications. On 30 April 1958, the IX Battalion became IX Mechanized Bersaglieri Battalion and it was moved to the 4th Armoured Infantry Regiment. The following day, the I and III Tank Battalions were transferred from the 4th Armoured Infantry Regiment, making the 1st Bersaglieri Regiment an armoured unit, with 2 Bersaglieri Battalions (I and VII Battalions) and 2 Tank Battalions (I and III Battalions).

In the late 1958, the 1st Bersaglieri Regiment lost the I Bersaglieri Battalion and the III Tank Battalion to the 182nd Armoured Infantry Regiment "Garibaldi". The remaining structure consisted of Regimental Command, VII Bersaglieri Battalion and I Tank Battalion, with the name of 1st Armoured Bersaglieri Regiment. At the end of 1958, the 1st Bersaglieri Regiment was assigned to the Armoured Division "Pozzuolo del Friuli" in Civitavecchia.p. 121

In January 1959, the Regiment was assigned to the Infantry Division "Granatieri di Sardegna", headquartered in Aurelia, Civitavecchia. The I Tank Battalion was renamed IX Tank Battalion; on 24 May 1961 the 2 Battalions were renamed I Bersaglieri Battalion and XVIII Tank Battalion.

The 1st Armoured Bersaglieri Regiment was moved to the Armoured Division "Centauro" on 1 September 1964; the same day the Regiment incorporated the VI Tank Battalion.

With the 1975 Italian Army reform, on 1 June the XVIII Tank Battalion was disestablished and on 1 August the Regiment was moved back to the Granatieri di Sardegna Division. The 1st Armoured Bersaglieri Regiment itself was disbanded on 31 October 1976.

Post-Cold War: 1995-present 
The 1st Bersaglieri Regiment was re-established again on 18 September 1995, consisting of the 1st Bersaglieri Battalion "La Marmora" within the Mechanized Brigade "Granatieri di Sardegna".

The Regiment, reduced in numbers, was disbanded in 2000; in 2002 it was re-established by renaming the 18th Bersaglieri Regiment.

Current structure 
As of 2019 the 1st Bersaglieri Regiment consists of:

  Regimental Command, in Cosenza
 Logistic Support Company "Falchi"
 1st Bersaglieri Battalion "La Marmora" 1st Fusiliers Company "Leopardi"
 2nd Fusiliers Company "Leoni"
 3rd Fusiliers Company "Lupi"
 4th Maneuver Support Company "Draghi"

The Command and Logistic Support Company fields the following platoons: C3 Platoon, Transport and Materiel Platoon, Medical Platoon, and Commissariat Platoon. The regiment is equipped with tracked Dardo infantry fighting vehicles. The Maneuver Support Company is equipped with M106 120mm mortar carriers and Dardo IFVs with Spike LR anti-tank guided missiles.

 Operations 

Through its history, the 1st Bersaglieri Regiment took part in several feats of arms.

 19th Century 
During the 19th century, the 1st Bersaglieri Regiment fought in:
 Third Italian War of Independence:
 Battle of Custoza;
 Battle of Borgoforte;
 Battle of Dogali.

 World War I 
During World War I, the 1st Bersaglieri Regiment fought in:
 Battle of Piana della Sernaglia (I Cyclists Battalion);
 Battle of Fogliano (I Cyclists Battalion);
 Battle of Monte Sei Busi (I Cyclists Battalion);
 Battle of Sella San Martino (I Cyclists Battalion);
 Battle of Trincea delle Frasche (I Cyclists Battalion);
 Battle of Altopiano di Asiago (I Cyclists Battalion);
 Battle of Coston di Lora (I Cyclists Battalion);
 Battle of Monte Pasubio (I Cyclists Battalion);
 Battle of M. Fior (I Cyclists Battalion);
 Battle of Marchesina (I Cyclists Battalion);
 Battle of Castagnevizza (I Cyclists Battalion);
 Battle of Piave (I Cyclists Battalion);
 Battle of Forcella Musis (I Cyclists Battalion);
 Battle of Forcella Campidello (I Cyclists Battalion);
 Battle of Lestans (I Cyclists Battalion);
 Battle of Sequals (I Cyclists Battalion);
 Battle of Caposile (I Cyclists Battalion);
 Battle of Fossalta (I Cyclists Battalion);
 Battle of Capo d’Argine (I Cyclists Battalion);
 Battle of Costellazzo (I Cyclists Battalion);
 Battle of Vittorio Veneto (Regimental Command and I Cyclists Battalion).

 Inter-war 
From 1916 to 1939, the 1st Bersaglieri Regiment fought in:
 1935-1936: Second Italo-Ethiopian War (the Regiment provided 16 Officers and 215 troops to several units);
 1939: Italian invasion of Albania (I Battalion)

 World War II 
During World War II, the 1st Bersaglieri Regiment fought in:
 Western Front
 Albania
 Italy
 Southern France

 Cold war to present 
During and after the Cold War, the 1st Bersaglieri Regiment provided resources for:
 1970: Reggio revolt (riot control and public order services);
 1978: Rome (1st Bersaglieri Battalion; riot control and public order services after the kidnapping of Aldo Moro);
 1980: Civitavecchia floods;
 1991: Special surveillance for First Gulf War;
 1991: Albanian refugees crisis;
 1992-1998: Vespri Siciliani;
 1997: Operation "Partenope";
 1997: Umbria and Marche earthquake;
 2003-2004: Operation Ancient Babylon;
 2010: ISAF
 2017: Operation Prima Parthica.

 Commanders 

During its periods of existence, the 1st Bersaglieri Regiment has been led by several Commanders.

 1861-1943 
 Colonel Emilio Pallavicini di Priola (1861-1862);
 Colonel Angelo Galletta (1862-1868);
 Colonel Carlo Sirola (1868-1872);
 Colonel Alessandro Ziani (1872-1876);
 Colonel Giovanni Baulina (1876-1877);
 Colonel Luigi Milanovick (1877-1883); 
 Colonel Carlo Ajmonino (1883-1888);
 Colonel Matteo Albertone (1888-1892);
 Colonel Marco Falta (1892-1896);
 Colonel Francesco Bellini (1896-1898);
 Colonel Giovanni Carlo Colta (1898-1901);
 Colonel Giacinto Tua (1901-1905);
 Colonel Carlo Miozzi (1905-1913);
 Colonel G.Battista Milani (1913-1914);
 Colonel Giuseppe Cassinis (May-7 November 1915);
 Colonel Egidio Ferdinando Castellano (8 November 1915 – 19 February 1916);
 Colonel Roberto Bertolotti (15 June 1918 – 26 June 1918);
 Colonel Attilio Emanuele (1920-1921);
 Colonel Aifremo Pelagatti (1921-1923);
 Colonel Massimiliano Gusberti (1923-1926);
 Colonel Francesco D' Agostino (1926-1927);
 Colonel Amedeo Bracciaferri (1928-1932);
 Colonel Giuseppe Moliearo (1932-1934);
 Colonel Giulio Cesare Gotti Porcinari (1934-1937);
 Colonel Tullio Bernardi (1937-1939);
 Colonel Giuseppe Azzaro (1939-1940);
 Colonel Giovanni Guidotti (1940-1941);
 Colonel Giorgio Bonansea (1942-1943);
 Colonel Vittorio Bizzarri (1 February 1943 – 8 September 1943).

 1953-1976 1st Bersaglieri Regiment Colonel G.Battista Calogero (1953-1954);
 Colonel Piero Testa (1954-1955);
 Colonel Pio Chirivino (1955-1956);
 Colonel Ezio Greco (1956-1957);
 Colonel Maurizio Federico (1957-1958);
 Colonel Raffaele Nini (1958-1959).1st Armoured Bersaglieri Regiment'''
 Colonel Augusto Arias (1959-1960);
 Colonel Giuseppe Palazzolo (1960-1961);
 Colonel Alfredo Grossi (1961-1962);
 Colonel Vittorio Lacatena (1962-1963);
 Colonel Silvio Alquati (1963 1965);
 Colonel Vito Martorana (1965-1967);
 Colonel Aldo Giambartolomei 1967-1968 
 Colonel Cesare Quagliardi (1968-1969);
 Colonel Adriano Salvadori (1969-1970);
 Colonel Roberto Roberti (1970-1971);
 Colonel Pasquale Fossataro (1971-1972);
 Colonel Enrico Palanza (1972-1973);
 Colonel Luigi Ramponi (1973-1974);
 Colonel Sandro Romagnoli (1974-1975);
 Colonel Pietro Pozzi (1975-1976).

1995-present 
 Lieutenant Colonel Biagio D'Angelo (1995-1996);
 Colonel Nicola Toma (1996-1998);
 Colonel Giancarlo Coscia (1998-2000);
 Colonel Salvatore Ciancimino (2000-2002); 
 Colonel Giuseppenicola Tota (2005-2006);
 Colonel Maurizio Angelo Scardino (2006-2008);
 Colonel Angelo Scardino (2006-2008);
 Colonel Francesco Maria Ceravolo (2006-2010);
 Colonel Cosimo Orlando (2010-2011);
 Colonel Luciano Carlozzo (2011-2012);
 Colonel Fabrizio Arconi;
 Colonel Giancarlo Sciascia;
 Colonel Luigi Iorio.

Headquarters 

 Cuneo (1861-1870);
 Turin (1870-1887);
 Ascoli Piceno (1878-1879);
 Senigallia (1879-1880);
 Rome (1880-1885);
 Treviso (1885-1890);
 Belluno (1890-1894);
 Palermo (1894-1900);
 Turin (1900-1907);
 Sanremo (1907-1914);
 Naples (1914-1943);
 Rome (1953-1955);
 Viterbo (1955-1958);
 Aurelia (1958-2004);
 Cosenza (2005–present).

See also 
 Bersaglieri

External links
Italian Army Website: 1st Bersaglieri Regiment

References

Military units and formations established in 1861
Military units and formations disestablished in 1943
Military units and formations established in 1953
Military units and formations disestablished in 1976
Military units and formations established in 1995
Military units and formations disestablished in 2000
Military units and formations established in 2002
Bersaglieri Regiments of Italy